The turnspit dog is an extinct short-legged, long-bodied dog bred to run on a wheel, called a turnspit or dog wheel, to turn meat. It is mentioned in Of English Dogs in 1576 under the name "Turnespete". William Bingley's Memoirs of British Quadrupeds (1809) also talks of a dog employed to help chefs and cooks. It is also known as the Kitchen Dog, the Cooking Dog, the Underdog and the Vernepator. The breed was lost, since it was considered to be such a lowly and common dog that no record was effectively kept of it. Some sources consider the Turnspit dog a kind of Glen of Imaal Terrier, while others make it a relative of the Welsh Corgi.

A preserved example of a turnspit dog is displayed at Abergavenny Museum in Abergavenny, Wales.

Work

The Vernepator Cur was bred to run on a wheel in order to turn meat so it would cook evenly. Due to the strenuous nature of the work, a pair of dogs would often be worked in shifts. According to John George Wood in The Illustrated Natural History (Mammalia) (1853):

The dogs were also taken to church to serve as foot warmers. One story says that during service at a church in Bath, the Bishop of Gloucester gave a sermon and uttered the line "It was then that Ezekiel saw the wheel...". At the mention of the word "wheel" several turnspit dogs, who had been brought to church as foot warmers, ran for the door.

Queen Victoria kept retired turnspit dogs as pets.

Appearance
Turnspit dogs were described as "long-bodied, crooked-legged and ugly dogs, with a suspicious, unhappy look about them". Delabere Blaine, a 19th-century veterinarian (and self-described "father of canine pathology"), classified the Turnspit dog as a variety of spaniel. Often they are shown with a white stripe down the center of their faces. According to Bingley's Memoirs of British Quadrupeds (1809): 

The turnspit dog is again described by H.D. Richardson in his book Dogs; Their Origin and Varieties (1847): 

The crooked leg is most likely owed to very distant ancestors as noted in Dogs And All About Them (1910), by Robert Leighton: 

The gene for chondrodysplasia in various short-legged breeds has been confirmed to trace back to a single ancestral mutation.

References

Further reading

External links

 "Whiskey" the turnspit dog, 19th century, stuffed, at Abergavenny Museum
 Dog wheel turnspit, 18th century, from Coed Cernyw, Monmouthshire, at Abergavenny Museum

Dog types
Extinct dog breeds
Dog breeds originating in the United Kingdom
Working dogs